Flowering Spade is the fifth album by Sean Hayes. It was released in 2007.

Flowering Spade is Hayes' first album recorded in a studio. Hayes authored all thirteen songs. Ches Smith, Shahzad Ismaily, Devin Hoff, Todd Roper, Ara Anderson, Rob Reich, and David Boyce from the avant-garde jazz and post-rock scenes of New York City, Los Angeles and San Francisco, performed on the album.

Track listing
 "All For Love"
 "Midnight Rounders"
 "Time"
 "Hip Kids"
 "Dolores Guerrero"
 "Cool Hand"
 "Baby I Do"
 "Onion"
 "Penniless Patron"
 "Sally Ann"
 "Sufidrop"
 "Elizabeth Sways"
 "Flowering Spade"

References

2007 albums
Sean Hayes (musician) albums